VIJ may refer to:

 Virgin Gorda Airport, an airport on Virgin Gorda in the British Virgin Islands
 VIJ Stadium, Jakarta, Indonesia, or its home team, Dutch East Indies football club Voetbalbond Indonesische Jacatra

See also 
 Vij